Nargeslu may refer to:
 Nargeslu-ye Olya
 Nargeslu-ye Sofla